Situations – The Very Best Of Cetu Javu is a compilation by Cetu Javu repackaged and re-released on Cleopatra Records as a "Best of" compilation album. It has an identical track listing to their debut album, Southern Lands.

Track listing
All songs written by Chris Demere (music) and Javier Revilla-Diez (lyrics).

 "Southern Lands" – 4:16
 "Love Me" – 4:15
 "Oye" – 4:24
 "Words Without Thoughts" – 4:23
 "So Strange" – 4:00
 "Get It" – 5:01
 "Situations" – 4:03
 "Bad Dreams" – 3:48
 "Have In Mind" – 3:33
 "Quién Lo Sabía?" – 7:12
 "Fight Without A Reason" – 2:49
 "Adónde" – 3:58

Personnel

Musicians
 Javier Revilla-Diez – lead vocals and backing vocals
 Christian Demere – synthesizers and drum machine
 Torsten Engelke – synthesizers
 Stefan Engelke – synthesizers

Production
 Recorded and mixed at Hansa Tonstudio, Berlin, except "Situations", "Have In Mind" and "Quién Lo Sabía?", recorded at Studio M, Hannover, by Jan Nemec. Remixed at Hansa Tonstudio, Berlin
 Produced by Cetu Javu & Matthias Härtl
 Engineered by Matthias Härtl
 Assistant engineers: Shannon Strong, A. Moses Schneider and Alex Leser

References

2009 albums
Cetu Javu albums
Cleopatra Records compilation albums